Dan O'Keefe (born )  is an American television writer and producer, who has worked on such shows as Seinfeld, The Drew Carey Show, The League,  Silicon Valley, and Veep.

Early and personal life 
O'Keefe was born to writers Deborah and Daniel O'Keefe, who was best known as the creator of the holiday Festivus. O'Keefe has two brothers: composer Laurence O'Keefe and screenwriter Mark O'Keefe.

O'Keefe graduated from Harvard College in 1990. He currently resides in Los Angeles.

Career 
As a television writer, O'Keefe was responsible for popularizing the holiday Festivus on the 1997 Seinfeld episode "The Strike". Festivus had been invented in the 1960s by O'Keefe's father, editor and author Daniel O'Keefe (1928–2012).

In 2005, Dan O'Keefe published an official book about the holiday and its history, titled The Real Festivus.

Bibliography 
 The Real Festivus (2005)

References

External links 

Excerpt from Chapter 1 of The Real Festivus in USA Today

American male screenwriters
1960s births
Living people
Date of birth missing (living people)
American male television writers
Harvard College alumni